Cristiano Lucarelli (born 4 October 1975) is an Italian football manager and a former player who played as a striker from 1992 until 2012. He is the manager of Serie B club Ternana.

Club career
Lucarelli was born in Livorno, Italy.

A journeyman striker, he had stints with eight different teams (including a brief run in Spain with Valencia) before signing with hometown A.S. Livorno Calcio in 2003. While playing for Torino F.C. the previous season, he attended a match that saw Livorno emerge victorious and earn promotion to Serie B, and he was among a throng of fans who rushed the pitch afterwards in celebration. He made an immediate impact in Livorno's return to Serie A in the 2003–04 season, scoring 29 goals in 38 matches and instantly winning a place in the hearts of Amaranto fans. He won the Golden Boot Award as Serie A's top goalscorer the following season, with 24 in 35 matches as Livorno finished in eighth place.

A rarity in the football world in terms of club loyalty, he rejected several better-paying offers from other Italian and European clubs (among them a €3 million offer from FC Zenit Saint Petersburg in July 2006) to remain with Livorno. He was once quoted as saying, "Some football players pay a billion for a Ferrari or a yacht; with that money I bought myself Livorno’s shirt. That's all."

He scored his 100th Serie A goal as part of a hat-trick in a 4–1 defeat of Catania on 1 April 2007.

Lucarelli's seemingly perfect relationship with the team soured after a conflict with club president Aldo Spinelli arose over the firing of coach Daniele Arrigoni in March 2007, during which he openly stated his desire to leave. It became permanently damaged a month later, when Lucarelli received a frosty reception from supporters after a sluggish 1–1 home draw with Reggina, with many fans going as far as to accuse Livorno of match-fixing. Lucarelli, hurt by the fans' criticism, reiterated his plans to leave Livorno at the end of the season.

In May, he was quick to snuff out rumors of a move to Serie A rivals ACF Fiorentina, and continued to remain ambiguous about his future with Livorno, claiming that he would make a decision on 6 June; five days later, Lucarelli announced that he would be staying home for next season due to a lack of offers from other teams, despite fresh rumors about Palermo, Parma and Sampdoria being interested in his services.

However, on 13 July, Lucarelli agreed to join Shakhtar Donetsk for £6 million, signing a three-year contract worth £2.8 million a season, thus becoming the first Italian to play in Ukraine. 

Lucarelli scored his first European goal for Shakhtar in their 3–1 third qualifying round return game of the 2007–08 Champions league against FC Red Bull Salzburg on 29 August 2007.

On 15 January 2008, Lucarelli was sold to Parma F.C. for ₤4 million, and he signed a three-and-a-half year, ₤1.2 million contract. His younger brother, Alessandro, joined him at Parma for the 2008–09 season. His time at Parma did not prove to be particularly successful, as he scored only four goals in 16 matches in the remaining half of the 2007–08 season, with his side being ultimately relegated to Serie B after a long struggle with results. He opted to stay with Parma also for the 2008–09 season, aiming to offer his contribution to bring the team back into the top flight. During the first part of the season, he initially served as the club's captain, and played 19 games, scoring a total eight goals; however, on 5 February, ahead of the team's away fixture against Ancona, he was ultimately left out of the first team after leaving a training session early, and was subsequently featured intermittently throughout the second half of the season. In total, he only made 29 appearances for the club throughout the season (out of a possible 42), scoring 12 goals.

In July 2009 Lucarelli completed a much-publicized comeback at Livorno on a loan move from Parma; he had already played for Livorno from 2003 to 2007.

In June 2010, after Livorno's relegation to Serie B and consequently, the loan ending, he returned to Parma, who continued in Serie A.

On 21 August 2010, it was announced that he had been loaned to Napoli. After two seasons with the club, he announced his retirement after the end of the 2011–12 season.

International career
Lucarelli was capped six times for the Italy senior squad between 2005 and 2007, scoring 3 goals; he was also a member of the team that took part in the 1996 Summer Olympics. His aforementioned debut was during a 2005 friendly tournament in the United States and Canada, where he scored his first international goal in a 1–1 draw against Serbia and Montenegro at the Rogers Centre in Toronto on 8 June. He was left off the Italy roster for the 2006 FIFA World Cup, but was recalled by new coach Roberto Donadoni – who had briefly coached Lucarelli at Livorno earlier in the year – for a friendly against Croatia on 16 August 2006.

Due to a rash of injuries among the Azzurri, Lucarelli was summoned for a pair of June Euro 2008 qualifiers against Lithuania and the Faroe Islands. He came on as a substitute for Filippo Inzaghi in the 58th minute of Italy's narrow 2–1 victory over the Faroe Islands on 2 June 2007, but did not play in a 2–0 defeat of Lithuania on 6 June. Lucarelli also substituted for Inzaghi in the 65th minute of a Euro 2008 qualifying match against France on 8 September 2007. He scored his first brace in Italy's 2–0 friendly  win over South Africa on 17 October.

Passion, political views and controversy
Lucarelli's passion for his home club often resulted in many questionable incidents. The May 2005 issue of Calcio Italia magazine reported that he had paid for a bus that brought a cadre of travelling Livorno fans back to the city after they had been arrested for rioting. He has the A.S. Livorno logo tattooed on his left forearm, and his jersey number, 99, was an homage to left-wing ultras group Brigate Autonome Livornesi, which was founded in 1999.

He was also of an increasingly rare breed of Italian footballer who openly brought his politics onto the pitch; his goal celebration consisted of a dual clenched-fist salute, a gesture made famous by the Communist party. He has openly stated that he is a supporter of communism. One of his mobile phone ringtones was Bandiera Rossa, and he once declared, “We Livorno get no favours from the referees because we are Communists!” but later retracted this statement.

He is a staunch admirer of Che Guevara, whose face is frequently displayed on Livorno fans' banners and T-shirts during matches. This first came to the fore in 1997, when, after scoring for Italy's Under-21 side, he celebrated by pulling his shirt over his face to reveal a shirt bearing Che Guevara's image. Despite his insisting that it was not a political gesture, he was consequently blackballed from the national team for several years until Marcello Lippi called him up as a starter for a friendly in 2005.

Lucarelli met Guevara's daughter, Aleida Guevara, after the 2004–05 Serie A season; one subject of discussion was the possibility of Livorno travelling to Cuba to play a charity match, but it never came to fruition.

Coaching career
Lucarelli became a youth coach at Parma for the 2012–13 season. Charge of the club's second most senior youth side (the Allievi Nazionale), which is composed of players aged between 15 and 17 years. He left Parma in June 2013 to accept an offer to become the new head coach of ambitious Lega Pro Prima Divisione club Perugia, only to be sacked before the season begin due to disagreements with the board. He then returned into management in October 2013, to become the new head coach of Viareggio, still in Lega Pro Prima Divisione. He then left the club in June 2014 to accept an offer from newly promoted Lega Pro club Pistoiese.

In October 2016 he was named new head coach of ailing Lega Pro club Messina. After guiding the club to safety during a period of serious financial struggles followed by a club takeover, Lucarelli and Messina mutually parted company by the end of the season. A few days later, he was announced as new head coach of fellow Sicilian Lega Pro club Catania.

In July 2017 he was appointed new coach of Catania. He left the club after one season in charge to become the manager of Livorno, but was sacked on 7 November due to a poor start in the 2018–19 Serie B season.

On 22 October 2019, he was hired by Catania once again. On 29 July 2020, his Catania contract was terminated by mutual consent.

On 8 August 2020, he joined Ternana in Serie C. Under his tenure, Ternana were crowned Girone C champions, winning promotion to Serie B on 3 April 2021 with still four games in hand.

After guiding Ternana to safety in their first season back to Serie B, and despite a positive start to the 2022–23 Serie B season, Lucarelli was dismissed on 26 November 2022 following a negative string of results; he was appointed back at the helm of Ternana on 27 February 2023, following the resignations of Aurelio Andreazzoli.

Outside of football
On 16 July 2010, Lucarelli became a share-holding partner of Carrarese; he initially owned 50% of the club's shares, along with Gianluigi Buffon and Maurizio Mian.

Personal life
Cristiano's younger brother, Alessandro, is also a former footballer, who played as a defender in the Serie A league (also sharing a few seasons together with Cristiano while at Livorno), and most notably captaining Parma.

His son Mattia (born 1999), a full back, followed on his father's footsteps and is currently a Livorno player since July 2022.

Career statistics

Club

International

Managerial statistics

Honours

Player
Perugia
Lega Pro Prima Divisione: 1993–94

Valencia
Copa del Rey: 1998–99
UEFA Intertoto Cup: 1998

Shakhtar
Ukrainian Premier League: 2007–08
Ukrainian Cup: 2007–08

Napoli
Coppa Italia: 2011–12

Individual
Serie A top-scorer: 2004–05

Managerial
Ternana
Serie C: 2020–21
Supercoppa di Serie C: 2021

References

External links
  
 HistoriasDeFútbol. Episodio 4 "Lucarelli el ragazzo de la 99"

Living people
1975 births
Sportspeople from Livorno
Association football forwards
Italian footballers
Italy international footballers
A.C. Perugia Calcio players
Atalanta B.C. players
Valencia CF players
U.S. Lecce players
Torino F.C. players
U.S. Livorno 1915 players
Calcio Padova players
Cosenza Calcio 1914 players
FC Shakhtar Donetsk players
Parma Calcio 1913 players
S.S.C. Napoli players
La Liga players
Serie A players
Serie B players
Serie C players
Olympic footballers of Italy
Footballers at the 1996 Summer Olympics
Italian expatriate footballers
Expatriate footballers in Spain
Expatriate footballers in Ukraine
Italian expatriate sportspeople in Ukraine
Italian communists
Ukrainian Premier League players
Catania S.S.D. managers
Mediterranean Games gold medalists for Italy
Mediterranean Games medalists in football
Competitors at the 1997 Mediterranean Games
Italian football managers
Serie B managers
Serie C managers
Footballers from Tuscany